Lokerpara Union is a union of Ghatail Upazila, Tangail District, Bangladesh.

Demographics
According to the 2011 Bangladesh census, Lokerpara Union had 6,006 households and a population of 23,832. The literacy rate (age 7 and over) was 45.2% (male: 47.6%, female: 42.9%).

See also
 Union Councils of Tangail District

References

Populated places in Tangail District
Unions of Ghatail Upazila